Nonivamide, also called pelargonic acid vanillylamide or PAVA, is an organic compound and a capsaicinoid. It is an amide of pelargonic acid (n-nonanoic acid) and vanillyl amine.  It is present in chili peppers, but is commonly manufactured synthetically. It is more heat-stable than capsaicin. 

Nonivamide is used as a food additive to add pungency to seasonings, flavorings, and spice blends. It is also used in the confectionery industry to create a hot sensation, and in the pharmaceutical industry in some formulations as a cheaper alternative to capsaicin. 

Like capsaicin, it can deter mammals (but not birds or insects) from consuming plants or seeds (e.g. squirrels and bird feeder seeds). This is consistent with nonivamide's role as a TRPV1 ion channel agonist. Mammalian TRPV1 is activated by heat and capsaicin, but the avian form is insensitive to capsaicin.  

Nonivamide is used (under the name PAVA) as the payload in "less-lethal munitions" such as the FN Herstal's FN 303 projectiles or as the active ingredient in most pepper sprays, which may be used as a chemical weapon. As a chemical irritant, pepper sprays have been used both as a riot control munition and also a weapon to disperse peaceful demonstrators; they have also been used in other contexts, such as military or police training exercises. While irritants commonly cause only "transient lacrimation, blepharospasm, superficial pain, and disorientation," their use and misuse also presents serious risks of more severe injury and disability.

Treatment
Nonivamide is not soluble in water, however water will dilute it and wash it away. One study found that milk of magnesia, baby shampoo, 2% lidocaine gel, or milk, did not demonstrate significantly better performance than water, when used on pepper spray.

See also
PAVA spray
Phenylacetylrinvanil

References 

Riot control agents
Lachrymatory agents
Capsaicinoids
Phenol ethers